Esperanza Base ('Hope Base') is a permanent, all-year-round Argentine research station in Hope Bay, Trinity Peninsula (in Graham Land on the Antarctic Peninsula). It is one of only two civilian settlements in Antarctica (the other being the Chilean Villa Las Estrellas). The base's motto is Permanencia, un acto de sacrificio ('Permanence, an act of sacrifice').

Description

Built in 1953, the base houses 56 inhabitants in winter, including 10 families and 2 school teachers. Provincial school #38 Presidente Raúl Ricardo Alfonsín (formerly named Julio Argentino Roca) was founded in 1978 and acquired independent status in 1997. It maintains the furthest South Scout troop.  The base has an Argentine civil register office where births and weddings are recorded. The base has tourist facilities that are visited by about 1,100 tourists each year.  The LRA 36 Radio Nacional Arcángel San Gabriel radio station started transmitting in 1979 and currently broadcasts on shortwave and FM. A wind generator was installed in 2008, mounted by INVAP.

The 43 buildings of the station have a combined space of  covered;  of fuel are used annually by the four generators to produce electricity for the station. Research projects include: glaciology, seismology, oceanography, coastal ecology, biology, geology, and limnology.

In the Hope Bay incident in 1952, this area was also the scene of the only shots fired in anger in Antarctica, when an Argentine shore party fired a machine gun over the heads of a Falkland Islands Dependencies Survey team unloading supplies from the John Biscoe to rebuild its damaged base. Following the Argentine show of force, the British team returned to the Falkland Islands. Shortly afterwards, Argentina issued a diplomatic apology, saying there had been a misunderstanding and the military commander on the ground had exceeded his authority. Despite this initial outward show of deference, the party was later welcomed back to Argentina with a hero's welcome. In the meantime, the John Biscoe had returned from the Falklands with a military escort and completed rebuilding the British base. The Antarctic Treaty of 1959 now treats the continent as a laboratory open to all, and provides that "no acts or activities ... shall constitute a basis for asserting, supporting or denying a claim to territorial sovereignty."

People

The base was the birthplace of Emilio Palma, the first person to be born in Antarctica. There have been at least ten other children born at the base.

Climate
Like the rest of the Antarctic Peninsula, the base has a polar climate characterized by strong winds that descend downwards from the Antarctic ice sheet. These winds can exceed , leading to blowing snow and reduced visibility. The climate is classified as a polar tundra (ET) climate in the Köppen system.

The temperature trend since 1948 is +0.0315 °C/yr (+0.0567 °F/yr) (annual), +0.0413 °C/yr (+0.0743 °F/yr) (winter) and +0.0300 °C/yr (+0.0540 °F/yr) (summer).

Historic site

A group of items or structures of historic significance at, or close to, the base have been designated a Historic Site or Monument (HSM 40), following a proposal by Argentina to the Antarctic Treaty Consultative Meeting. These comprise a bust of General San Martin, a grotto with a statue of the Virgin of Lujan, a flagpole erected in 1955, and a cemetery with a stele commemorating Argentine expedition members who died in the area.

General Martín Güemes Refuge 
Refuge General Martín Güemes is the name given to two shelters in Antarctica. The first one is covered by ice, the second one is active. The refuge is Administered by the Argentine Army and depends on Esperanza Base, which is responsible for maintenance and care.

General Martín Güemes I Refuge 
The first refuge  was located on the north east coast of the Duse Bay of the Trinity Peninsula and opened on October 23, 1953. , at that time head of the newly created Esperanza Base, participated in its construction, being one of the first refuges installed by the Army and the second in the continental Antarctica. The refuge was destroyed by the ice in 1960.

General Martín Güemes II Refuge 
The second refuge  is active and is located in the Tabarin Peninsula and was inaugurated on September 15, 1959. It has capacity for six people, food for a month, fuel, gas and a first aid kit.

See also
 Argentine Antarctica
 Hope Bay incident
 List of lighthouses in Antarctica
 List of Antarctic research stations
 List of Antarctic field camps

Notes

Further reading
Antarctica. Sydney: Reader's Digest, 1985, p. 156-157.
Child, Jack. Antarctica and South American Geopolitics: Frozen Lebensraum. New York: Praeger Publishers, 1988, p. 73.
Lonely Planet, Antarctica: a Lonely Planet Travel Survival Kit, Oakland, CA: Lonely Planet Publications, 1996, 302-304.
Stewart, Andrew, Antarctica: An Encyclopedia. London: McFarland and Co., 1990 (2 volumes), p. 469.
U.S. National Science Foundation, Geographic Names of the Antarctic, Fred G. Alberts, ed. Washington: NSF, 1980.

References

External links 

Council Of Managers Of National Antarctic Programs: Base Esperanza
Temperatures
 Argentine Army's site about the base
 Official website Direccion Nacional del Antartico
 Fundaciòn Marambio Esperanza Base page
 COMNAP Antarctic Facilities
 COMNAP Antarctic Facilities Map

Argentine Antarctica
Outposts of Graham Land
Populated places established in 1953
Trinity Peninsula
Historic Sites and Monuments of Antarctica
Cemeteries in Antarctica
Lighthouses in Antarctica
1953 establishments in Antarctica